The 1964 Orange Bowl was the thirtieth edition of the college football bowl game, played at the Orange Bowl in Miami, Florida, on Wednesday, January 1. Part of the 1963–64 bowl game season, it featured the sixth-ranked Nebraska Cornhuskers of the Big Eight Conference and the #5 Auburn Tigers of the Southeastern Conference (SEC). Nebraska scored early and won 13–7.

Teams

Nebraska Cornhuskers

Under second-year head coach Bob Devaney, the Cornhuskers won their first Big Eight title since 1940. The only blemish was a home non-conference loss to Air Force. This was Nebraska's third appearance in a major bowl game, and second in the Orange Bowl, the first was nine years earlier.

Auburn Tigers 

The Tigers finished second in the Southeastern Conference; they defeated rival Alabama but lost to Mississippi State in Jackson. This was Auburn's first appearance in a bowl game since 1955, and first Orange Bowl since 1938.

Game summary
In the opening possession, quarterback Dennis Claridge gave the Cornhuskers a 7–0 lead on his 68-yard run from a short-yardage formation. Dave Theisen added two field goals to give them a 13–0 lead at halftime; Auburn quarterback Jimmy Sidle ran in from thirteen yards out to make it 13–7 after three quarters.

The fourth quarter was scoreless. In the closing minutes, Auburn was driving down the field for the potential win, at the Nebraska eleven. On fourth down, linebacker John Kirby batted a Tiger pass away, and the Cornhuskers gained their first victory in a major bowl game. Claridge ran for 108 yards on the day.

This was the seventh matchup of the two conferences in the Orange Bowl, the SEC had swept the first six.

Scoring
First quarter
Nebraska – Dennis Claridge 68-yard run (Dave Theisen kick), 13:47
Nebraska – Theisen 31-yard field goal, 5:26
Second quarter
Nebraska – Theisen 36-yard field goal, 13:05
Third quarter
Auburn – Jimmy Sidle 13-yard run (Woody Woodall kick), 3:32
Fourth quarter
No scoring

Statistics
{| class=wikitable style="text-align:center"
! Statistics !! Nebraska  !!   Auburn  
|-
|First Downs	||11	||17
|-
|Rushes–yards	||26–204||57–126
|-
|Passing yards	||30	||157
|-
|Passing (C–A–I)||4–9–0 ||14–27–1
|-
|Total Offense	||35–234||84–283
|-
|Punts–average	||7–38.3||6–35.2
|-
|Fumbles–lost 	||2–1	||3–1
|-
|Turnovers 	||1	||2
|-
|Penalties–yards||6–65	||5–39
|}

Aftermath
This was the last year without an MVP award honored to the best player.

This is the most recent Orange Bowl played during the day; the telecast on ABC was in direct competition with the Cotton Bowl (CBS) and Sugar Bowl (NBC); all three started at around 2 pm EST. Most of the audio from the telecast (featuring Curt Gowdy, Paul Christman, and Jim McKay's commentary) survives, though the video footage is lost. The broadcast rights transferred to NBC and the kickoff was moved to 8 pm in January 1965, the final game of the network's tripleheader of major bowls (Sugar, Rose, Orange) on New Year's Day.

Both final polls were released in early December, prior to the bowls.

References

Orange Bowl
Orange Bowl
Auburn Tigers football bowl games
Nebraska Cornhuskers football bowl games
January 1964 sports events in the United States
Orange Bowl